Frederick Roy Goodall (31 December 1902 – 19 January 1982) was a professional footballer, who played for Huddersfield Town for 16 years and played 25 games for England, 12 as captain.

Goodall would have captained England in the first ever World Cup if they had decided to take a team to the tournament. He was widely regarded as one of the best defenders in the world at that time.

He was captain of Huddersfield Town throughout their most successful period, when they became the first team to win the English top flight three times in a row and dominated English football through the twenties.

In 1945, he became manager of Mansfield Town.

Honours
 Football League First Division winner: 1923–24, 1924–25, 1925–26.
 Football League First Division runner-up: 1926–27, 1927–28, 1933–34.
 FA Cup winner: 1922.
 FA Cup runner-up: 1928 & 1930.
 FA Charity Shield winner: 1922.

References

1902 births
1982 deaths
People from Dronfield
Footballers from Derbyshire
English footballers
England international footballers
Association football defenders
English Football League players
Huddersfield Town A.F.C. players
English football managers
Mansfield Town F.C. managers
English Football League representative players
FA Cup Final players